Sloan–Hendrix High School is a public high school in Imboden, Arkansas, United States. It is part of the Sloan–Hendrix School District.

Academics 
The assumed course of study is the Smart Core curriculum developed by the Arkansas Department of Education (ADE). Students complete regular (core and career focus) courses and exams and may select Advanced Placement coursework and exams, which provide an opportunity to receive college credit prior to high school graduation. The school is accredited by the ADE and has been accredited by AdvancED since 1991.

Extracurricular activities 
The Sloan–Hendrix High School mascot is the greyhound, with black and gold serving as its school colors.  For 2012–14, the Sloan-Hendrix Greyhounds compete in the 2A 2 Conference under the administration of the Arkansas Activities Association (AAA). Interscholastic activities include archery, band, baseball, basketball (boys/girls), choir, color guard, cross country (boys/girls), softball, track (boys/girls), and trap shooting.

Notable alumni
 Alan Belcher, professional mixed martial artist

References

External links 
 

Public high schools in Arkansas
Schools in Lawrence County, Arkansas
Hendrix College